The Compañía Marítima Building also known as the Marítima Ruins is a neoclassical heritage building located in Cebu City, Philippines that was built in 1910. It was one of the first buildings constructed in the city's port area, and was known by different names throughout its history: Fernando Building and Shamrock Hotel before the war, and currently, the Compañía Marítima de Cebú.

Location 
The Compañía Marítima is a three-story building located at the waterfront area in the old district of Cebu City near the east coast of the South Road Properties (SRP). It is situated on a 42,000-square-meter lot on Quezon Boulevard between P. Burgos and Lapu-lapu Streets and accessible from the Cebu City Hall and Carbon Market.

Design 
Its architectural style is characterized as neoclassical, which was typical of structures constructed during the American colonization, that featured prominent arched windows, classical pilasters, "ornamental beams, and sculptured railings on its roof decks." Architect Karl Cabilao wrote, "Its façade is at times reminiscent of beautiful Renaissance palazzos of Europe."

History

Fernandez Building 
The structure was built in 1910 on a reclaimed land where the then new port of Cebu was established. Popularly known during that time as the Fernandez Building, it was one of the first buildings constructed in the port area. The company Fernandez Hermanos Inc., which was founded by brothers Jose and Ramon Fernandez, owned it but it was uncertain who the first occupants were.

Shamrock Hotel 
It is not clear too when the Manila Steamship Company's offices occupied the building's first floor and the Shamrock Hotel on the upper floors. However, according to the author Lucy Urgello Miller, the hotel – whose proprietor was Mike Ryan as shown on the 1937 advertising postcard – occupied the entire building by the 1930s. Because of its close proximity to the port, patrons could disembark from the shipping vessels and cross the street to check in for accommodation.

Compañía Marítima 

Despite the damages from bombings in World War II, the building survived. After repairs were made in the post-war era, it became the location of the Compañía Marítima de Cebú, one of the successful pre-war transportation companies established in 1886 and the biggest shipping firm in the Philippines whose vessels navigated around western and southern Mindanao ports. When the business filed for bankruptcy in 1980, the building was abandoned.

It presently is in a state of disrepair, roofless, and missing interior walls. Its company name used to be visible on its waterfront wall, and its roofs were destroyed by Typhoon Ruping in 1992. On October 26, 2013, the city's Department of Engineering and Public Works declared it "off-limits" because of the structural damage it sustained during the earthquake that occurred on October 15.

Devotee City 
The property surrounding the building was designated as parking lot in 2015. It has also served as Devotee City, a temporary holding area to host pilgrims from neighboring towns and provinces who had no place to stay during the Sinulog festivities every January since 2016.

Property ownership 

The land on which the building stands is the subject of an ownership dispute between the Cebu Port Authority (CPA) and the Cebu City government. The port area near the Compañía Marítima was reclaimed to construct the viaduct that connected to the tunnel from SRP to McArthur Boulevard, and the resulting reclaimed lot was given by the Department of Public Works and Highways to the CPA through a memorandum of agreement. CPA's legal officer Yusop Uckung claimed that a land title as proof of ownership was not necessary as the government owned "foreshore areas."

On July 4, 2013, during the term of Michael Rama, the city government issued a tax declaration as evidence of its possession of the property. A case to stop the city government from ownership was filed by CPA representing the national government through the Office of the Solicitor General on July 7, 2015, and Regional Trial Court Judge Soliver Peras denied the plea on November 16, 2015, stating that the area no longer served as a shipping dock. In January, 2016, CPA asked the Court of Appeals to overturn the local court's ruling.

References 

Buildings and structures in Cebu
Neoclassical architecture in the Philippines
Tourist attractions in Cebu City
Buildings and structures in Cebu City
Buildings and structures completed in 1910
Tourist attractions in Cebu
20th-century architecture in the Philippines